Night Voices: Strange Stories is a collection by Robert Aickman published in 1985.

Plot summary
Night Voices: Strange Stories is a collection of six horror tales.

Reception
Dave Langford reviewed Night Voices: Strange Stories for White Dwarf #68, and stated that "Shadows fall obliquely; something is half-seen at the corner of the eye; the telling is quiet and understated, but shivers lurk in the implications. Nothing is ever explained. Those who only giggle at H P Lovecraft will find Aickman expert at raising small, persistent goose-pimples."

Reviews
Review by Chris Morgan (1985) in Fantasy Review, June 1985
Review by Nigel Richardson (1985) in Vector 128

References

1985 novels